L'Auberge (French for "the inn") may refer to:

Restaurants
 L'Auberge (restaurant), former Dutch restaurant with two Michelin stars
 L'Auberge de Cendrillon, restaurant in Disneyland Paris
 L'Auberge du Pont de Collonges, French restaurant with three Michelin stars, run by Paul Bocuse

Films
 L'Auberge espagnole, 2002 French film
 L'Auberge du Bon Repos, 1903 French silent movie

Other uses
 L'Auberge du Lac Resort, casino hotel in the United States
 Auberge rouge, French criminal case
 The Auberge of the Flowering Hearth, book by Roy Andries de Groot

See also
 Auberge (disambiguation)